Patricia Carol (Pat) Hoban (born 16 October 1932) is a retired Australian women's basketball player.

Biography
Hoban played for the Australia women's national basketball team at the 1957 FIBA World Championship for Women, hosted by Brazil.

References

1932 births
Living people
Australian women's basketball players